Eat Drink Man Woman is a 1994 Taiwanese comedy-drama film directed by Ang Lee, from a script co-written with James Schamus and Hui-Ling Wang. It stars Sihung Lung, Wang Yu-wen, Wu Chien-lien, and Yang Kuei-mei. as members of the Zhu family navigate the challenges of love, life, tradition and family. Part of Lee's "Father Knows Best" trilogy and similar to Lee's other works, this film deals with the transition from tradition to modernity. It is Lee's only film, to date, to be shot entirely in his native Taiwan.

The film premiered in Taiwan on July 2, 1994, and it was both a critical and box office success. It won several accolades including an Academy Award nomination for Best Foreign Language Film. It was also nominated for both a Golden Globe and BAFTA Award, as well as three Golden Horse Awards and six Independent Spirit Awards. It would inspire films like Tortilla Soup and Joyful Reunion  and has an eponymous musical rendition. A BBC Culture poll of film critics ranked the film at number 54 of the 100 Greatest Non-English Language Films.

The title is a quote from the Book of Rites, one of the Confucian classics, referring to the basic human desires and accepting them as natural. The beginning of the quote reads as follows: “The things which men greatly desire are comprehended in food and drink and sexual pleasure.”

Plot
On a Sunday evening in Taipei, semi-retired chef and widower Zhu prepares a feast for his three daughters. Jia-Jen, the eldest, is a chemistry teacher who devotes herself to Christianity after facing heartbreak from her college ex-boyfriend. The second daughter, Jia-Chien, is an executive at an airline company. She wanted to become a head chef like her father but he claimed that it was not for a woman. Jia-Ning, the youngest, is a college student who works part-time at a Wendy's fast food restaurant.

At dinner, Jia-Chien announces that she has invested in a new apartment and will be moving out once construction is complete. Surprisingly, Mr. Zhu approves. Jia-Chien criticizes the flavor, claiming Mr. Zhu's taste is deteriorating. Mr. Zhu dismisses the idea before suddenly rushing off to help his (and Jia-Chien's) long-time friend and "taster", Old Wen, at a banquet. Afterwards, Mr. Zhu wonders with Old Wen if there is anything more to life than eating, drinking, man, and woman. Meanwhile, family friend Jin-Rong stops by the Zhu residence with her daughter Shan-Shan. Jin-Rong vocalizes her difficulties with a messy divorce while being responsible for work, Shan-Shan, and her opinionated mother, Madame Liang, as she returns to Taipei from America. Jia-Jen comforts her while Shan-Shan colors a caricature of Mr. Zhu.

The next morning, Mr. Zhu meets Shan-Shan, learns that the lunches Jin-Rong provides her are suboptimal, and decides to cook for her. Shan-Shan agrees, giving Mr. Zhu the lunches her mom made to prevent her from discovering their secret. At school, Jia-Jen meets the new volleyball coach Ming-Dao and they take interest in one another. Jia-Chien meets the chief negotiator Li Kai during a meeting at work and they flirt with one another. She has a chance to relocate to Amsterdam due to a potential promotion. Jia-Ning meets up with Guo-Lun, her friend Rachel's on-and-off boyfriend. As Guo-Lun mopes about his unrequited love, Jia-Ning comforts him, telling him that true love is being with someone you can express your feelings to comfortably, leading Guo-Lun to realize his feelings for Jia-Ning.

Meanwhile, Old Wen becomes hospitalized. Jia-Jen is fooled by love letters she believes are from Ming-Dao, falling for a prank by her students. Jia-Chien's apartment investment falls through as she discovers that the apartment company went bankrupt and ran away with her savings. She also learns that it was Li Kai who broke Jia-Jen's heart in college and avoids romance with him. Jia-Ning faces a dilemma when she begins dating Guo-Lun even after Rachel confesses that she loves him. Mr. Zhu's health deteriorates and secretly visits the hospital, unaware that Jia-Chien saw him while visiting Old Wen. Eventually, Old Wen passes away and Mr. Zhu concludes that his sense of taste has officially departed.

At another Sunday feast, Jia-Chien announces that she will no longer be moving out; Mr. Zhu tells her not to worry. Later, Jia-Ning reveals her relationship with Guo-Lun and her pregnancy. The next dinner, Jia-Jen divulges that she and Ming-Dao have eloped. Jia-Jen and Jia-Ning move out of the residence, leaving Mr. Zhu with Jia-Chien. Troubled, Mr. Zhu begins to confide in and meet Madame Liang, leading the daughters to believe that the two are romantically involved.

Worried about her father's health, Jia-Chien rejects her promotion. Soon, the sisters, their partners, and Jin-Rong's family gather for a large Sunday feast. Mr. Zhu announces his engagement, not to Madame Liang, but to Jin-Rong, abruptly ending the dinner. Later, Jia-Ning and Guo-Lun have their baby, Jia-Jen converts Ming-Dao to Christianity, and Mr. Zhu sells the family home and buys a condo with Jin-Rong and Shan-Shan. Jia-Chien, no longer needing to take care of her father, accepts the job in Amsterdam. Before she leaves she prepares a final feast for the family in the family home, but only Mr. Zhu arrives. When Mr. Zhu criticizes her cooking, he suddenly realizes that his sense of taste has returned. The two hold each other’s hands in the dining room, and call each other “Father” and “Daughter”.

Cast

 Lung Sihung as Zhu, an aging master Chinese chef and the widower father of three adult daughters.
 Yang Kuei-mei as Zhu Jia-Jen, the eldest daughter, who works as a high school teacher. Jia-Chien believes that Li Kai broke the heart of her older sister Jia-Jen, and Dariotis and Fung wrote that the event seems to have caused Jia-Jen to turn away from the world. Later in film it is revealed that Jia-Jen fabricated the story, in order to "create a barrier against intimacy—even with her family" according to Dariotis and Fung. Ultimately she marries a new boyfriend after being abstinent for nine years. Her family members seem puzzled when they realize he is not a Christian but Jia-Jen says "He will be."
 Wu Chien-lien as Zhu Jia-Chien, the second daughter, an executive at an airline company. Unlike her elder sister, Jia-Chien is sexually liberated, and suspects she disapproves of her moral system.
Chien-lien Wu, who plays Jia-Chien, also portrays Mr. Chu's dead wife. Lizzie Francke wrote that Jia-Chien taking the role of the cook "makes manifest the various needs that bind a family by setting a mother back at the heart of it". Dariotis and Fung wrote that therefore the phrase from Francke has multiple meanings since Jia-Chien takes her father's role of being a chef and therefore "is trying to be the son her father never had" and she takes the role of the mother.
 Wang Yu-wen as Zhu Jia-Ning, the youngest daughter, who works at Wendy’s fast food restaurant. She becomes involved with an on-and-off boyfriend of her friend Rachel and gets into a love triangle.
 Winston Chao as Li Kai, Jia-Chien’s co-worker and love interest. She believes Li Kai broke the heart of her older sister Jia-Jen, and Dariotis and Fung wrote that the event seems to have caused Jia-Jen to turn away from the world. Later in film it is revealed that Jia-Jen fabricated the story, in order to "create a barrier against intimacy—even with her family" according to Dariotis and Fung.
 Sylvia Chang as Liang Jin-Rong, a single mother and neighbour of Chu’s, going through a messy divorce.
 Gua Ah-leh as Madame Liang, Jin-Rong’s mother who’s recently moved back to Taiwan from the United States.
 Chen Chao-jung as Guo Lun, Rachel’s ex-boyfriend and eventually Jia-Ning’s love interest.
 Lu Chin-cheng as Ming-Dao, the high school volleyball coach whom Jia-Jen falls in love with.
 Lester Chit-Man Chan as Raymond, Jia-Chien’s ex-boyfriend.
 Yu Chen as Rachel, Jia-Ning’s friend and co-worker.
 Tang Yu-Chien as Shan-Shan, Jin-Rong’s six-year old daughter.
 Wang Jui as Old Wen, Chu’s longtime friend and fellow chef.
 Hsu Gin-Ming as Coach Chai
 Lin Huel-Yi as Sister Chang

Themes 
Wei Ming Dariotis and Eileen Fung, authors of "Breaking the Soy Sauce Jar: Diaspora and Displacement in the Films of Ang Lee", wrote that Jia-Jen's story is that of a "spinster turned sensual woman". They wrote that her Christianity was there "perhaps to match her role as a mother-figure". She suspects Jia-Chien of disapproving of her moral system. Dariotis and Fung wrote that after Jia-Chien states that she needs not a mother but sister, Jia-Jen "is able to become who she really is with all the complexity that entails" rather than being someone she believed her family needed, with "who she really is" being "a modern, conservative, Christian, sexually aggressive Taiwanese woman". Desson Howe of The Washington Post wrote that of the actresses, Yang was the "most memorable".

Dariotis and Fung wrote that Jia-Ning's story is of "naïveté and immature love" and that the love triangle involving her, Guo Lun, and Rachel "is in many ways a parody of comic book romance." Dariotis and Fung argue that Jia-Ning's story, along with Jia-Jen's, is "not only flat but also dangerously uncomplicated." They further state that "[t]he lack of inquiry is endemic of this storyline" and that its "superficial treatment" is "quite disturbing."

“Due to love and traditional matters, they have to obey, they have to care well. They’re not really level with each other. I think that’s the biggest problem in that family, so the food and that banquet in the movie has become a ritual,” said Ang Lee. The banquet becomes a burden on the family.

The authors Hong Zhao and Haixin Jin argue in their article 破坏中的重建与传承——《饮食男女》解读 that in the film Eat Drink Man Woman, Zhu’s family first maintains a semblance of calm when everyone represses their desires, then, the family is destructed when members throw off the shackles of their family roles to pursue their own desires. The family structure is eventually reconstructed when everyone’s desire for eat, drink and sex is well balanced. At the beginning of the film, Zhu’s family struggles between maintaining the banquet (eat and drink) and their sexual desire (man and woman). Food is the bond that holds the family together. However, though they dine together every week, they are afraid to confide in each other. When they focus on “eat drink” but suppress sexual desire, the family is unhappy. No one enjoys the meal and Zhu even loses his sense of taste. When Zhu, Jia Jen, and Jia Ning chase after their sexual desires (man and woman), the original family structure disintegrates, but the family becomes happier since everyone gets what they want. The desire for food and sex eventually reach a balance and Zhu’s sense of taste is back at this moment.

Each character in this film has their own desire but at the beginning of the film, due to the concern with their family roles, they cannot express themselves.

Production 
Eat Drink Man Woman was filmed on-location in director Ang Lee's hometown Taipei. As of 2022, it is Lee's only film to be shot entirely in Taiwan.

The opening sequence - in which a Sunday lunch is lovingly prepared - took over a week to film and was accomplished with the use of an actual master chef, who doubled for actor Sihung Lung.

Music 
The musical score was composed by French musician Thierry Schollhammer, credited under the mononym "Mader", and arranged by Sarah Plant. The soundtrack was released by Varèse Sarabande.

Track listing 

Included in the film but not on the soundtrack, are several Mandopop tracks and classical excerpts from "Israel in Egypt", "All Creatures of Our God and King", and "Quattro pezzi sacri."

Reception

Box office 
The film grossed $24.2 million worldwide generating the third biggest percentage return on cost of films released in the year, behind Four Weddings and a Funeral and The Lion King. It was the highest-grossing foreign-language film in the United States and Canada for the year with a gross of $7.3 million.

Critical response
In her review in The New York Times, Janet Maslin praised Ang Lee as "a warmly engaging storyteller". She wrote, "Wonderfully seductive, and nicely knowing about all of its characters' appetites, Eat Drink Man Woman makes for an uncomplicatedly pleasant experience".

In his review in The Washington Post, Hal Hinson called the film a "beautiful balance of elements ... mellow, harmonious and poignantly funny". Hinson concluded:

According to the review aggregator website Rotten Tomatoes, 91% of critics have given the film a positive review based on 46 reviews, with an average rating of 7.6/10. The site's critics consensus reads, "A richly layered look at the complex interactions between a widowed chef and his daughters, Ang Lee's generational comedy Eat Drink Man Woman offers filmgoers a tasty cinematic treat."

Awards and nominations

Legacy 
Tortilla Soup, a 2001 American comedy-drama film directed by Maria Ripoll, is based on Eat Drink Man Woman. A semi-sequel, Eat Drink Man Woman 2012 [饮食男女2012] (billed as Joyful Reunion in English) was released, with Jui-Yuan Tsao, producer for the original film, serving as director, and a new set of characters exploring similar themes.

The film was adapted off-screen as well. In 2019, produced by PerfectMatch Theatre co., LTD, the National Kaohsiung Centre for the Arts put on a musical production titled, Eat Drink Man Woman: The Musical. The musical is a direct adaptation of the film. With a total runtime of 160 minutes, the production strived to showcase as many iconic aspects from Ang Lee's film, such as the character's unique qualities and the beauty of food, through song and dance as possible. Unfortunately, the musical only ran for a recorded three days in September 2019; the production had a total of one night showing and two matinees.

Father Knows Best trilogy 
Eat Drink Man Woman is Ang Lee’s third feature film and forms the final part of his ‘Father Knows Best’ Trilogy, following Pushing Hands (1991) and The Wedding Banquet (1993). All three films depict a clash between cultures like youth and old age, tradition and progress, east and west, and investigate the freedoms and constraints inherent in family structures particularly those between fathers, daughters and sons. Si-hung Lung takes the place of a father in all three films - here as Mr. Zhu, a retired master chef - and He had used it as the motif (idealization of the household's head) to resolve all the contradictions and conflict that happened within the family members. The trilogy also takes the repression of individual desire in the face of social pressure as one of its central themes.

See also
 List of submissions to the 67th Academy Awards for Best Foreign Language Film
 List of Taiwanese submissions for the Academy Award for Best Foreign Language Film

Notes

References

Bibliography

 
 Dariotis, Wei Ming and Eileen Fung. "Breaking the Soy Sauce Jar: Diaspora and Displacement in the Films of Ang Lee." in: Lu, Sheldon Hsiao-peng (Xiaopeng) (editor). Transnational Chinese Cinemas: Identity, Nationhood, Gender. University of Hawaii Press, 1 January 1997. , 9780824818456.

External links
 
 
 
 
 

1994 films
1994 comedy-drama films
American comedy-drama films
Taiwanese comedy-drama films
1990s Mandarin-language films
Cooking films
American interfaith romance films
Films directed by Ang Lee
Films with screenplays by Ang Lee
Films with screenplays by James Schamus
1994 independent films
Films shot in Taipei
The Samuel Goldwyn Company films
Central Motion Picture Corporation films
1990s American films